Jackson College is a college in Jackson, Michigan.

Jackson College may also refer to:

 Jackson College for Women, Massachusetts, part of the Tufts University School of Arts and Sciences
 Jackson College (Tennessee), an 1800s institution burned during the American Civil War
 Jackson College, Hawaii, a predecessor of Hawai'i Pacific University
 Sheldon Jackson College, Alaska, active 1878–2007
 Jackson State University, Mississippi, formerly known as Jackson College and Jackson State College
 Jackson State Community College, Tennessee
 Jackson Junior College, a college for Negroes in Marianna, Florida, 1961-1965

See also 
 Jackson University (disambiguation)
 Jackson School (disambiguation)